Velké Hostěrádky is a municipality and village in Břeclav District in the South Moravian Region of the Czech Republic. It has about 500 inhabitants.

References

Villages in Břeclav District
Moravian Slovakia